The Hurt Business (stylized as THE HURT BUSINE$$) is a 2016 American documentary film about mixed martial arts, its history, and rise from a stigmatized, fringe event to a mainstream sport. It is directed by Vlad Yudin and narrated by Kevin Costner.

Participants

Reception
A review by The Hollywood Reporter described it as "a scattered intro that offers some history and introduces a few of the players who are currently big on the scene, but hardly inspires a disinterested viewer to drop everything and set the DVR for the next UFC bout. Some faithful fight fans may rally for the doc's theatrical bookings, but even on VOD, it promises to underwhelm most for whom the names Jon Jones and Sara McMann mean something."

References

External links

Bruce Buffer Chats with "The Hurt Business's" Vlad Yudin on the It's Time w/ Bruce Buffer podcast

2016 films
2016 documentary films
American sports documentary films
Films set in the United States
Mixed martial arts documentaries
Documentary films about sportspeople
2010s English-language films
2010s American films